Norton Confidential is a program released in 2006 designed to encrypt passwords online and to detect phishing sites.

References

Antivirus software
2006 software